Vresthena is a small village in the Parnon mountains, Laconia, Greece. It is part of the municipality of Sparta.

See also
List of settlements in Laconia

References

Populated places in Laconia